Elizabeth, Kentucky may refer to several places:

 Hopkinsville, Kentucky, originally known as Elizabeth
 Elizabethtown, Kentucky, also formerly known as Elizabeth